Agnes Elizabeth Jenns (January 1911 – 11 January 1968) was a 1930s.British film actress.

Jenns married actor Harry Crocker in late 1936 and then Gardner Clarence Carpenter in late 1939.  She made her American film debut in A Star Is Born, acting alongside Fredric March and Janet Gaynor.

She died on January 11, 1968, Fond du Lac County, Wisconsin, United States.

Films

References

External links

 
publicity shot from Channel Crossing
image from The Baltimore Sun
publicity shot from A Star is Born with Fredric March

British film actresses
1911 births
1968 deaths